Founded in 2010, the Inter Tijuana is a Mexican professional futsal team; team based in Tijuana, Mexico.

References

Futsal clubs in Mexico
Sports teams in Tijuana